Embajador Martini is a village and rural locality (municipality) in Realicó Department, La Pampa in Argentina, it is located at the intersection of National Route 35 and Provincial Route 2, in the northeast of the province.

References

Populated places in La Pampa Province